Battle of Dover Strait may refer to:

 Battle of Dover Strait (1916), 26-27 October 1916, in the First World War
 Battle of Dover Strait (1917), 21 April 1917, in the First World War
 Battle of the Narrow Seas, also known as Battle of the Dover Straits, 3–4 October 1602, in the Anglo-Spanish War (1585–1604)

See also
 Battle of Dover, three actions named for the town